Brazil Clay County Airport  is a public-use airport located three nautical miles (3.5 mi, 5.6 km) south of the central business district of Brazil, a city in Clay County, Indiana, United States. It is owned by the Brazil-Clay County BOAC.

Facilities and aircraft 
It has one runway designated 9/27 with an asphalt surface measuring 2,941 by 40 feet (896 x 12 m).

For the 12-month period ending December 31, 2010, the airport had 5,957 aircraft operations, an average of 16 per day: 98% general aviation and 2% air taxi. At that time there were 17 aircraft based at this airport: 94% single-engine and 6% helicopter.

References

External links 
 Aerial photo from INDOT Airport Directory
 Aerial photo as of 29 March 1998 from USGS The National Map
 
 

Airports in Indiana
Transportation buildings and structures in Clay County, Indiana